Slum is a 2013 Indian Kannada-language crime film directed by M. Mahesh Kumar. It stars Mayur Patel, Neha Patil, P. Murthy and Disha Poovaiah in pivotal roles.  The film is based on a real-life crime that occurred in Bangalore.

Plot

Cast 

 Mayur Patel as Lucky
 Neha Patel as Usha
 P. Murthy as Surya
 Achyuth Kumar as Swamy
 Disha Poovaiah
 Gururaj Hosakote
 Cheluvaraj P.
 Patre Nagaraj
 Harish Rai
 Achuth Rao
 Shobh Raj
 Shiva Manju

Soundtrack 

The music for the soundtrack was composed by B. R. Hemanth Kumar and the background music for the film was scored by the duo Ashley-Abhilash. The album has five soundtracks.

Critical reception 
Slum received generally mixed response from critics upon its theatrical release. G. S. Kumar of The Times of India gave the film a rating of two out of four and wrote, "The movie is full of bloodshed and murders. While Mayur Patel has shown some maturity, P Murthy has a long way to go. This is not the right movie for Neha Patil or Disha Poovaiah to prove their acting talent. Music by BR Hemanthkumar has a couple of catchy tunes."

References 

2010s Kannada-language films
2013 crime films
2013 films
Indian crime films